German submarine U-3014 was a Type XXI U-boat of Nazi Germany's Kriegsmarine during World War II. The Elektroboote submarine was laid down on 28 August 1944 at the AG Weser yard at Bremen, launched on 25 October 1944, and commissioned on 17 December 1944 under the command of Kapitänleutnant Karl-Heinz Marbach.

U-3014 was a brand new, high technology electric boat which could run constantly submerged rather than having to surface to recharge her batteries every day the way submarines until that point had had to do. However, these advanced vessels were introduced to the Kriegsmarine only late in 1944, much too late to influence the Battle of the Atlantic, and too late for many of them to serve in an offensive capacity at all.

With the end of the war near, training on U-boats had dropped to a minimum due to lack of fuel, falling morale and the effectiveness of allied attacks on U-boat construction and preparation. The exception to this were the new Type XXI boats, which continued to train in the Baltic Sea.

Design
Like all Type XXI U-boats, U-3014 had a displacement of  when at the surface and  while submerged. The submarine was powered by two MAN SE supercharged six-cylinder M6V40/46KBB diesel engines each providing , two Siemens-Schuckert GU365/30 double-acting electric motors each providing , and two Siemens-Schuckert silent running GV232/28 electric motors each providing .

U-3014 was fitted with six  torpedo tubes in the bow and four  C/30 anti-aircraft guns. She could carry twenty-three torpedoes or seventeen torpedoes and twelve mines. The complement was five officers and fifty-two men.

Fate
U-3014 was scuttled by her crew on 3 May 1945 at Neustadt, Germany.

References

Bibliography

External links
 

World War II submarines of Germany
Type XXI submarines
World War II shipwrecks in the North Sea
U-boats commissioned in 1944
1944 ships
Ships built in Bremen (state)
Operation Regenbogen (U-boat)
Maritime incidents in May 1945